The 58th district of the Texas House of Representatives contains all of Johnson and Somervell counties. The current Representative is DeWayne Burns, who was first elected in 2014.

References 

58